Law of attraction may refer to:

 Electromagnetic attraction
 Newton's law of universal gravitation
 Law of attraction (New Thought), a pseudoscientific belief in New Thought
 Laws of Attraction, a 2004 film
 Laws of Attraction (TV series), a television series